The 2020 United States attorney general elections were held on November 3, 2020, in 10 states. The previous attorney general elections for this group of states took place in 2016, except in Vermont where attorneys general only serve two-year terms and elected their current attorney general in 2018. Nine state attorneys general ran for reelection and eight won, while Republican Tim Fox of Montana could not run again due to term limits and Republican Curtis Hill of Indiana was eliminated in the Republican convention.

The elections took place concurrently with the 2020 presidential election, elections to the House of Representatives and Senate, and numerous state and local elections.

No attorneys general offices changed party control in 2020.

Election predictions 
Several sites and individuals published predictions of competitive seats. These predictions looked at factors such as the strength of the incumbent (if the incumbent is running for re-election), the strength of the candidates, and the partisan leanings of the state (reflected in part by the state's Cook Partisan Voting Index rating). The predictions assigned ratings to each seat, with the rating indicating the predicted advantage that a party has in winning that seat.

Most election predictors use:

 "tossup": no advantage
 "tilt" (used by some predictors): advantage that is not quite as strong as "lean"
 "lean": slight advantage
 "likely": significant, but surmountable, advantage
 "safe": near-certain chance of victory

Statistics

Race summary

Closest races 
States where the margin of victory was under 1%

 North Carolina, 0.26%

States where the margin of victory was between 1% and 5%:
 Pennsylvania, 4.52%

Blue denotes races won by Democrats.

Partisan control of statewide offices

Indiana 

The 2020 Indiana Attorney General election was held on November 3, 2020, to elect the attorney general of the U.S. state of Indiana. The Democratic primary convention was scheduled for June 13, 2020. The Republican primary convention was scheduled with a live stream on June 18, 2020, followed by mail-in voting between June 22 and July 9.

Incumbent Attorney General Curtis Hill ran for re-election, but was defeated at the Republican nominating convention by former U.S. Representative Todd Rokita, who eventually won after three rounds of votes. Jonathan Weinzapfel, former mayor of Evansville, narrowly won the Democratic nomination at the party's nominating convention. 

In the general election, Rokita defeated Weinzapfel by approximately 500,000 votes, a margin of more than 16 percentage points. Due to a smaller third-party vote, both Rokita and Weinzapfel received a larger percentage of the vote than their party's candidates in the state's presidential and gubernatorial elections. Rokita carried Tippecanoe County, which voted for Democrat Joe Biden in the presidential race, while Weinzapfel carried his home of Vanderburgh County, which voted for Republicans Donald Trump and Eric Holcomb in the presidential and gubernatorial races.

Democratic convention

Republican convention

General election

Missouri 

The 2020 Missouri Attorney General election was held on November 3, 2020, to elect the attorney general of Missouri. It was held concurrently with the 2020 U.S. presidential election, along with elections to the United States Senate and United States House of Representatives, as well as various state and local elections. Incumbent Republican Attorney General Eric Schmitt was elected to a full term, defeating Democrat Rich Finneran. He was appointed by Governor Mike Parson after Josh Hawley was elected to the U.S Senate in 2018.

Republican primary

Democratic primary

General election

Montana 

The 2020 Montana Attorney General election was held on November 3, 2020, to elect the attorney general of the U.S. state of Montana. Incumbent Republican Montana Attorney General Tim Fox was re-elected in 2016 with 67.7% of the vote. Fox was term-limited and was ineligible to run for re-election. Fox decided to run for the Governor of Montana election, losing the nomination to Greg Gianforte. Republican Austin Knudsen defeated Republican Jon Bennion in the primary and defeated Democrat Raph Graybill in the general election by over 14 points.

Republican primary

Democratic primary

General election

North Carolina 

The 2020 North Carolina Attorney General election was held on November 3, 2020, to elect the attorney general of North Carolina, concurrently with the 2020 U.S. presidential election, as well as elections to the United States Senate and elections to the United States House of Representatives and various state and local elections.

Party primary elections were held on March 3, 2020.

Incumbent Democratic Attorney General Josh Stein, first elected in 2016, ran for re-election against Republican Forsyth County District Attorney Jim O'Neill. With a narrow margin separating Stein and O'Neill, the Associated Press was finally able to call Stein the winner on Nov. 17, 2020 (two weeks after Election Day).

Republican primary

Democratic primary 
This primary was canceled because Attorney General Josh Stein was uncontested.

General election

Oregon 

The 2020 Oregon Attorney General election was held on November 3, 2020, to elect the attorney general of Oregon. Incumbent Democratic Attorney General Ellen Rosenblum was originally appointed to the role by former Governor John Kitzhaber on June 29, 2012 to finish the term of her predecessor John Kroger, who resigned from office. She was elected to a full term in 2012 and re-elected in 2016. This office is not subject to term limits, and Rosenblum won a third full term, defeating Republican activist Michael Cross who led an unsuccessful 2019 attempt to recall Governor Kate Brown.

Republican primary

Democratic primary

General election

Pennsylvania 

The 2020 Pennsylvania Attorney General was held on November 3, 2020. Primary elections were originally due to take place on April 28, 2020. However, following concerns regarding the COVID-19 pandemic in the United States including Pennsylvania, the primaries were delayed until June 2, 2020. Incumbent Democratic Attorney General Josh Shapiro defeated Republican Heather Heidelbaugh to win a second term.

Republican primary

Democratic primary

General election

Utah 

The 2020 Utah Attorney General election was held on November 3, 2020 along with several federal and state elections.

Incumbent Attorney General Sean Reyes was re-elected to a third term, defeating Democratic nominee Greg Skordas and Libertarian nominee Rudy Bautista.

Republican primary

Democratic convention 
Greg Skordas ran unopposed for the nomination.

Libertarian convention 
Defense attorney Rudy Bautista won the nomination.

General election

Vermont 

The 2020 Vermont Attorney General election was held on November 3, 2020 along with several federal and state elections.

Incumbent Democratic Attorney General T. J. Donovan won re-election in a landslide over Republican H. Brooke Paige.

Democratic primary

Republican primary

Progressive primary

General election

Washington 

The 2020 Washington Attorney General election was held on November 3, 2020 along with several federal and state elections.

Incumbent Attorney General Bob Ferguson ran for re-election. He finished first in the open primary, receiving 56% of the vote, and then defeated primary runner-up Republican Matt Larkin in the general election.

Results

West Virginia 

The 2020 West Virginia Attorney General election was held on November 3, 2020 along with several federal and state elections.

Republican incumbent Patrick Morrisey ran for re-election after being re-elected with 51.6% of the vote in 2016. He was unopposed in the Republican primary and faced Democrat Sam Petsonk on election day. He defeated Petsonk in a landslide.

Republican primary

Democratic primary

General election

See also 

 2021 Virginia Attorney General election

Notes

References